Ditto Knolls is a historic home and farm located near Hagerstown, Washington County, Maryland, United States. It was built about 1790, and is a five-bay, two-story brick house with a two-bay, one-story brick rear wing. It features a one-story entrance porch supported by Doric columns. Also on the property is a large stone bank barn and springhouse.  It is one of two historic farm complexes located in Ditto Farm Regional Park, along with the Henry McCauley Farm.

Ditto Knolls was listed on the National Register of Historic Places in 1976.

References

External links
, including photo from 1974, at Maryland Historical Trust

Farms on the National Register of Historic Places in Maryland
Houses completed in 1790
Houses in Hagerstown, Maryland
National Register of Historic Places in Washington County, Maryland